Bangla Pokkho is a pro-Bangla advocacy organization that focuses on rights for Bengalis in the Indian Union, Bengali Nationalism (not to be confused with Bangladeshi Nationalism) and works against the Hindi-Urdu cultural and linguistic imperialism and forced domination of Hindi speakers in West Bengal. It is organized along linguistic lines and aimed at protecting Bengali culture. It uses the Bengali slogan Joy Bangla.

Demands and Protests

Bangla Pokkho majorly demands 100% reservation for residents of West Bengal in fields of Government job and 90% reservation in other job sectors, education, military, administration works. The group has done numerous meetings, gatherings and rallies throughout many places of West Bengal and Tripura.

Bangla Pokkho, also demanding domicile reservation gave numerous deputations in universities, which eventually resulted in starting Domicile reservation in Calcutta University  and Jadavpur University

Bangla pokkho also demanded for Bengali language in various exams i.e. Rail, JEE, NEET etc., and in Banks, offices and other sectors. The group proposed that the top administrative officials in West Bengal must come from WBCS/WBPS cadre and not IAS/IPS.

Bangla Pokkho made protest when Bengali workers in WBSEDCL were expelled as they had not fluency in English and Hindi. After protests, the company has taken back then and enacted them in respective places.

Massive controversy broke out when in the second season of webseries ‘Abhay’, released on OTT platform Zee5, young Bengali freedom fighter Khudiram Bose was shown as a ‘criminal’ in its second episode. Bangla Pokkho along with many nationalist organisations protested and demanded the show to be banned. The group sent a legal notice to remove the scene. After that Zee5 edited and re-released the show cutting out the Khudiram image.

The group opposed the CAA, NRC, planned by the central government to be implemented in Bengal. Bangla Pokkho said that the BJP unlawfully had passed the laws in the parliament to break the unity of Hindus and Muslims.

The group also protested against the idea of formation of Gorkhaland. They fired an idol of Subramaniyam Swami who proposed to make a separate state from West Bengal namely Gorkhaland 

Bangla Pokkho along with Kanchanpur Nagarik Surakkha Mancha meet in a big protest in Tripura, that gathered more than 30,000 Bengalis in Tripura, complaining against social discrimination of Bengalis by the Tripura state BJP Government.

Major successes

 Bangla Pokkho's mass protests resulted in starting Domicile reservation in Calcutta University  and Jadavpur University.
Hindi and English languages were used in Kolkata Metro Rail smart cards. In this regard, the Bangla Pokkho protested and pointed out the non-use of Bengali language in Bengali-speaking states and the use of Hindi to the exclusion of Bengali. Bengali language was included in Kolkata Metro Rail smart card after this protest.
West Bengal Police Constable Examination, which was used to held in Hindi, Urdu and English previously, changed into Bengali and Nepali language due to mass protests.
Bengali language was introduced as a medium in IBPS examination for Banks.
The SET exam, used to recruit college faculties, introduced Bengali language as a medium.
Domicile reservation started in WBSETCL.
Major banks and ATMs started to use Bengali language in the bank forms, which were previously in Hindi and English only.

Support and criticism
As of January 2019, Bangla Pokkho claims to have 200,000-300,000 supporters.  Supporters usually have a stand for promotion and protection of Bengali culture and strict opposition to ill aspects of Bihari and Bhojpuri culture.Bangla Pokkho is known to promote Hindu Muslim unity in among Bengalis. Maidul Islam, political analyst and faculty member of Centre for Studies in Social Sciences, terms this as rise of organic nationalist left of center, after the decline of Left and its class politics.

References

External links
 Official website

Political activism
Language advocacy organizations
Advocacy groups in India